Eastern Goldfields College is a public co-educational high day school, located in Kalgoorlie, Western Australia. It is located on the Curtin University campus in Kalgoorlie and shares many facilities with the University. The College accepts year 11 and 12 students from across the Goldfields region.

History
The school was formerly a part of Eastern Goldfields Senior High School, but the school split in 2006 onto two separate campuses. The original site on Boomerang Crescent became Kalgoorlie-Boulder Community High School with classes for years 7-10. Senior students were moved to the local Curtin University campus and the students benefited from the high quality university facilities that were made available to them, particularly in the areas of trade and hospitality. The name of the school and its pegasus logo were made official in 2006.

Enrolment 
Enrolments at the school were generally growing in the first three years, however it dipped significantly between 2011 and  2013.

Sport
The College competes annually at country week, which is a sporting competition held in Perth between country high schools. Eastern Goldfields has competed in sports including hockey, netball, basketball, football, soccer, volleyball, speech, and debate.

Eastern Goldfields has also competed in rugby union games against rival high school John Paul College (Kalgoorlie). This competition began in 2006 and is held annually. Both the Year 11 and 12's and the year 8-10's represent their own 15-man squads.

See also 

 List of schools in rural Western Australia
 Education in Australia

References

Sources 

EGSHS Reunion
Eastern Goldfields Senior High School
School Sport WA
EGC
Perth
Media Release TEE
The Australian
Dux Honour Board

Public high schools in Western Australia
2006 establishments in Australia
City of Kalgoorlie–Boulder
Educational institutions established in 2006